The 1967 Louisville Cardinals football team was an American football team that represented the University of Louisville in the Missouri Valley Conference (MVC) during the 1967 NCAA University Division football season. In their 22nd season under head coach Frank Camp, the Cardinals compiled a 5–5 record (1–3 against conference opponents) and outscored opponents by a total of 260 to 162.

The team's statistical leaders included Wally Oyler with 1,039 passing yards, Wayne Patrick with 582 rushing yards and 60 points scored, and Jim Zamberlan with 559 receiving yards.

Schedule

References

Louisville
Louisville Cardinals football seasons
Louisville Cardinals football